Disinvestment in Public sector undertakings in India is a process of public asset sales done by the President of India on behalf of the Government of India. It can be directly offered for sale to the private sector or indirectly done through a bidding process. The Public Enterprises Survey (2015–16), brought out by the Department of Public Enterprises, Ministry of Heavy Industries, & Government of India on the performance of Central Public Sector Enterprises was placed in both the Houses of Parliament on 21 March 2017. There were 331 CPSEs in 2017-18, out of which 257 were in operation. The remaining 74 of the CPSEs were being established.

Following the theories of Economic Liberalism and Infrastructure-based development as referenced in the Union Budget of India, the total expenditure of the Government of India increased from ₹1,13,422 crore in 1991–92 to ₹ 21,46,735 Crore in 2017–18. To help raise the necessary capital for these expenditures and also to minimize the nation's fiscal deficit, the Government of India started privatisation of all government establishments which includes Public sector undertakings. Conceding to the demands of privatization, the Government of India slowly began the privatisation of government establishments such as PSU's despite stiff resistance from labour unions. The below table provides data regarding the disinvestment process which started in 1991 (barring 2 small units being CMC Limited and Patherele Concrete).

Major disinvestment steps were taken in the past by the BJP-led NDA government between 1999 and 2004. BJP privatized the central government establishments such as central public sector units which included  Bharat Aluminium Company (BALCO), Hindustan Zinc (both to Sterlite Industries), Indian Petrochemicals Corporation Limited (to Reliance Industries) and VSNL (to the Tata group) and various state government establishments which included many state public sector units.  While track record and future of these companies were good, they have all failed under the private establishments that they were sold to.

Between 2014 and 2018 the BJP-led NDA government divested a total of ₹1,94,646 crore, which included minority and majority stakes of the most profitable central government establishments such as central public sector units which includes ONGC-HPCL deal which was worth ₹ 36,915 crore. In the budgetary announcements of the financial year 2017-18, the late Finance minister Arun Jaitley announced that the government will initiate privatization of 24 CPSUs, including Air India Limited which has been converted from a profit making entity into  a loss making entity by the BJP-NDA government during the year 1999-2004 and this process has been further re-initiated by the BJP-NDA government during  the year 2015-2019. It has resulted in privatization and sale of a central government establishment to the private players which will lead to rise in the prices of air carrier services for the citizens of India. This process has led to a loss of the taxpayer over ₹69,575.64 crores over the past decade. This would have been the first year in which the government was on track to hit the divestment target. However, this did not go through as planned since the Covid-19 crisis threw the entire world economy into disarray. On 17 May 2020, as part of a stimulus package the Finance minister Nirmala Sitharaman announced that the government will privatize all government establishments which also includes Public sector enterprises in all the sectors. She also stated that in all the strategic sectors, the number of PSU's will be limited to 4. In strategic sectors with more than 4 PSU's, the government will privatize, merge or consolidate the PSU's under holding companies in order to reduce wasteful administrative costs. Nirmala Sitharaman stated that there is a need for a coherent policy where all sectors are open to private sector participation while PSU's play an important role in defined areas.

Since financial year 1991-92 to 2017-18 the Government of India sold public assets totalling ₹3,47,439 Crore. In recent years, certain public sector undertakings performed reasonably well and paid significant dividends to the government, whereas other PSU's such as Air India, BSNL, and MTNL made huge losses, costing the taxpayer massive amounts of money. Net Profit of all 257 operating CPSEs during 2016-17 stood at ₹ 1,27,602 crore compared to ₹ 1,14,239 crore during 2015-16 showing growth of 11.70%, while Loss of loss incurring CPSEs minimized to ₹ 25,045 crore in 2016-17 compared to ₹ 30,759 crore in 2015-16 showing a decrease in loss by 18.58%.

Total Sum Till 2017-18 ₹ 3,47,439

See also

 Public sector undertakings in India
 List of public sector undertakings in India
 Public sector banks in India
 Banking in India
 Five-Year Plans of India

References

Public sector in India
Economic reforms